is a former Japanese politician who served as Prime Minister of Japan between April 2000 and April 2001.  He was unpopular in opinion polls during his time in office, and is known for making controversial statements, both during and after his premiership. He also served as the President of the Japan Rugby Football Union as well as the Japan-Korea Parliamentarians' Union. In 2014, he was appointed to head the organizing committee for the 2020 Summer Olympics and Paralympics,  but he resigned in February 2021 following gaffes made at a committee meeting that were perceived as sexist.

Early life and education
Yoshiro Mori was born in present-day Nomi, Ishikawa, Japan, as the son of Shigeki and Kaoru Mori, wealthy rice farmers with a history in politics, as both his father and grandfather served as the mayor of Neagari, Ishikawa Prefecture. His mother died when Yoshiro was seven years old. He studied at the Waseda University in Tokyo, joining the rugby union club. He developed a passion for the sport but was never a high-level player; he once compared rugby to his relationship with other parties in the ruling coalition by stating: "In rugby, one person doesn't become a star, one person plays for all, and all play for one."

After university, Mori joined the Sankei Shimbun, a conservative newspaper in Japan.

Political career

In 1962, he left the newspaper and became secretary of a Diet member, and in the 1969 general election, he was elected in the lower house at age 32. He was reelected 10 consecutive times. In 1980, he was involved in the Recruit scandal about receiving unlisted shares of Recruit (company) before they were publicly traded, and selling them after they were made public for a profit of approximately 1 million dollars.

He was education minister in 1983 and 1984, international trade and industry minister in 1992 and 1993, and construction minister in 1995 and 1996.

In 1999, Mori began to assume control of the Mitsuzuka faction (formerly Abe faction) that had been headed by Hiroshi Mitsuzuka in the Liberal Democratic Party (LDP).

Prime minister
In the midst of a battle with Liberal Party leader Ichirō Ozawa, Prime Minister Keizō Obuchi suffered a stroke and cerebral hemorrhage on 2 April 2000 and was unable to continue in office. The Cabinet held an emergency meeting and resigned en masse. Mori, who was the secretary general of the Liberal Democratic Party (LDP), was unanimously elected president, and became prime minister with the votes of the LDP, New Komeito and New Conservative Party (composed of members who left Ozawa's party on 3 April). Mori announced that he would keep Obuchi's cabinet in place.

Gaffes

The media coverage of Mori's term as prime minister was dominated by his gaffes and undiplomatic comments. Even prior to his election as prime minister, he had been described in the Japanese media as having "the heart of a flea and the brain of a shark".

 In January 2000, he made a joke about his campaign in the 1969 election: "When I was greeting farmers from my car, they all went into their homes. I felt like I had AIDS."
 In February 2000, when asked about the Year 2000 problem in the United States, Mori quipped that "when there is a blackout, the murderers always come out. It's that type of society."
 At Obuchi's funeral, Mori failed to clap and bow properly before Obuchi's shrine, an important portion of a traditional Japanese funeral rite. The other world leaders present at the funeral, including then U.S. President Bill Clinton, performed the ritual correctly.
 At a meeting of Shinto followers in Tokyo in May 2000, Mori described Japan as "a divine nation (kami no kuni) with the Emperor at its center". This "divine nation statement" stirred controversy in Japan as it invoked the official interpretation of the Emperor as a divine entity during the days of the Empire of Japan. Days after this statement, Mori questioned whether the Japan Communist Party could "ensure Japan's security and defend the kokutai", using a term for Japan's unity with its divine emperor which had not been in common use since World War II.
 During the June 2000 election, when asked about recent newspaper reports that showed that roughly half of the voters still had not decided for whom to vote, he replied that they could "stay in bed for the day".
 In October 2000, during a dialogue with British prime minister Tony Blair, Mori stated that the Japanese government had suggested in 1997 that Japanese nationals believed to be abducted by North Korea be arranged to be "found" elsewhere in order to ensure a smooth normalization of the relation between North Korea and Japan, which upset the foreign ministry and led to calls for Mori's resignation from conservative voices within the LDP.
 In December 2000, pictures appeared in the weekly magazine Shukan Gendai showing him drinking in an Osaka bar with a high-ranking Yakuza.
 In February 2001, the US submarine USS Greeneville accidentally hit and sank the Japanese fishing ship Ehime Maru during an emergency surface drill on 9 February 2001, resulting in nine dead students and teachers. Mori continued a round of golf after being told of the incident, for which he was criticized as being politically tone-deaf.
 One unsubstantiated story concerned the 26th G8 summit in 2000, at which upon meeting U.S. President Bill Clinton, Mori was to say "How are you". Instead, he allegedly slipped up and said "Who are you;" Clinton answered "Well, I'm Hillary Clinton's husband", to which Mori replied "Me too". Snopes.com reported that this was obviously a low-quality fabrication/joke and that the same story had been told about Kim Young-sam several months earlier. It was nonetheless reported by some mainstream media outlets such as the Australian Broadcasting Corporation.

Resignation
Two senior Mori appointees resigned due to fundraising scandals in August 2000. Mori's disapproval rating neared 60% following these resignations.

In November 2000, with Mori's approval ratings below 30%, opposition politicians attempted to win a vote of no confidence against Mori by soliciting support from rebels within the LDP, guided by Koichi Kato in the so-called "Kato's rebellion". Hiromu Nonaka, the secretary general of the party, quashed the potential revolt by threatening to expel any LDP politicians who voted for the measure. The vote failed 237 to 190. Nonaka resigned days later amid speculation that he would challenge Mori for leadership of the LDP.

Towards the end of Mori's term, his approval rating dropped to single digits. In March 2001, reports surfaced that Mori had told LDP leaders of his plans to resign. Although he denied the reports, they contributed to a massive drop in Japanese stock market prices early that week. On 6 April, he officially announced his intention to resign. Junichiro Koizumi won the subsequent LDP leadership election and became prime minister on 26 April 2001.

Cabinets
Mori appointed three cabinets. The third cabinet is officially referred to as a continuation of the second cabinet, as the changes came amid a major administrative realignment in January 2001 that eliminated several cabinet positions and renamed several key ministries.

Later years
After resigning as prime minister, Mori remained a member of the House of Representatives, representing the Ishikawa 2nd district, until announcing in July 2012 that he would not stand in the December 2012 general election.

He was awarded the Padma Bhushan, India's third highest civilian award, in 2004.

Russia diplomacy

Mori remained an important player in Russo-Japanese relations following his resignation as prime minister due to his close personal relationship with Vladimir Putin. Prime Minister Yoshihiko Noda of the Democratic Party of Japan considered tapping Mori in 2012 to resolve the dispute between the two countries over the Kuril Islands, despite the fact that Noda and Mori were from opposing parties in the Diet.

In 2013, Mori met with Putin and Sergey Naryshkin in preparations for a summit between Putin and Japanese Prime Minister Shinzō Abe. Mori had at one time suggested that Japan could give Russia three of the four disputed islands in exchange for a peace treaty, which went against the Japanese government's official view that Moscow should acknowledge Japan's ownership of all four.

Mori has a personal connection to Russia, as his father Shigeki Mori developed a relationship with the Siberian town of Shelekhov during his time as mayor of the city of Neagari, and developed a bilateral dialogue to improve the gravesites of Soviet soldiers in Japan and Japanese soldiers in Siberia; he was so close to Russia that Japanese authorities monitored him closely as a potential communist sympathizer. The elder Mori visited Shelekhov more than 15 times during his 35 years in office, and was buried there following his death.

Sports-related advocacy
Mori became President of the Japan Rugby Football Union in June 2005. It had been hoped his clout would help secure the 2011 Rugby Union World Cup for Japan, but instead the event was awarded to New Zealand in late November 2005. This led Mori to accuse the Commonwealth of Nations countries of "passing the ball around their friends." Mori later assisted in Japan's successful bids for both the 2019 Rugby World Cup and 2020 Summer Olympics.

In 2014, at the age of 76, he was appointed to head the organizing committee for the 2020 Summer Olympics in Tokyo. He quipped, "I am destined to live five or six more years if I am lucky. This will be my one last service to the country." However, Mori drew international and domestic criticism for his critical statements about Japan's Olympic figure skaters Mao Asada and Chris Reed and Cathy Reed, who were representing Japan at the 2014 Sochi Olympics.

Another controversy occurred in 2021 when Mori, who at this time was president of the organization responsible for the upcoming Olympic Games, said that women talk too much in meetings. At the organizing committee meeting for the Tokyo Olympics while discussing the objective of aiming for at least 40% of members to be female, he stated that “On boards with a lot of women, the board meetings take so much time. Women have a strong sense of competition. If one person raises their hand, others probably think, I need to say something too. That’s why everyone speaks.” He apologized for his statements and initially stated he would not resign as head of the organizing committee, but on February 11 announced his intention to step down from the post. In his resignation speech the following day, Mori said that he did not intend to demean women, and blamed the media for fueling public anger. He stressed the importance that the Olympics be held in July, adding that the committee's efforts would be wasted if he were to cause trouble by remaining in his post. Seiko Hashimoto, an Olympic bronze medalist in women's speed skating and a seven-time Olympian, was named as Mori's replacement.

Personal life
Mori is an avid rugby fan as well as amateur player. He is married to Chieko (born: Chieko Maki), a fellow Waseda University student, and he has a son, Yūki Mori, and a daughter, Yoko Fujimoto.

In 2003, he received the highest distinction of the Scout Association of Japan, the Golden Pheasant Award.

Honours
National
  Golden Pheasant Award (2003)
  Grand Cordon of the Order of the Paulownia Flowers (2017)
Foreign
  Padma Bhushan (2004)
  Order of Brilliant Star with Special Grand Cordon (2006)
  Medal "In Commemoration of the 300th Anniversary of Saint Petersburg" (2007)
  Grand Officier, Légion d'honneur (2010)
  Order of Diplomatic Service Merit Grand Gwanghwa Medal (2010)

Notes

References
 Richards, Huw A Game for Hooligans: The History of Rugby Union (Mainstream Publishing, Edinburgh, 2007)

External links

 Official website (in Japanese)
 

|-

|-

|-

|-

1937 births
Living people
20th-century prime ministers of Japan
21st-century prime ministers of Japan
Japanese journalists
Japanese rugby union players
Liberal Democratic Party (Japan) politicians
Recipients of the Legion of Honour
Ministers of Construction of Japan
Presidents of the Organising Committees for the Olympic Games
Prime Ministers of Japan
Recipients of the Order of Brilliant Star
Recipients of the Padma Bhushan in public affairs
Recipients of the Paralympic Order
Waseda University alumni
21st-century Japanese politicians
Politicians from Ishikawa Prefecture
Russophilia